Pinneberg (Northern Low Saxon: Pinnbarg) is a town in the federal state of Schleswig-Holstein in northern Germany. It is the capital of the district of Pinneberg  and has a population of about 43,500 inhabitants. Pinneberg is located 18 km northwest of the city centre of Hamburg. 

Near Pinneberg is the transmission site for the maritime weather radioteletype and radiofax service DDH47, working on 147.3 kHz. A T-aerial is used, strung between two guyed masts.

History

When a castle was first built in Pinneberg around the year 1200 AD, the site had already been used as a Germanic Thingstätte for several centuries. In 1370 the castle was captured by Count Adolf VIII of Schauenburg and Holstein-Pinneberg.

In 1397 Pinneberg was first mentioned in official documents as a seat of courts.

In 1472 a Renaissance castle was built in place of the old castle. It was heavily damaged in the years 1627 and 1657 and was finally torn down in 1720. Between 1765 and 1767 the Drostei was built for the Drost Hans von Ahlefeldt. This brick building, which was probably erected by Ernst Georg Sonnin, is the most important example of Baroque architecture in the district of Pinneberg.

After some servants and craftsmen had settled in the vicinity of the castle, the settlement expanded slowly, only receiving municipal rights in 1875, although it had been the seat of the Danish 'Landdrost' since 1640 and seat of the Prussian district administrator since 1866 within the Province of Schleswig-Holstein.

In 1905 the settlement of ‘Pinneberger Dorf’ was incorporated and in 1927 the villages of Thesdorf and Waldenau followed.

After World War II the number of inhabitants of Pinneberg doubled because of the forced immigration of expellees, predominantly from East Prussia. Later on, in contrast to many other cities in Schleswig-Holstein, Pinneberg was able to keep the number of inhabitants stable.

Population

 1824 – 900
 1875 – 3,060
 1905 – 6,074 (incorporation of Pinnebergerdorf adding 1,500 inhabitants)
 1927 – 7,903 (incorporation of Thesdorf adding 1,313 inhabitants)
 1939 – 13,494
 1948 – 24,885
 1955 – 25,161
 1970 – 36,002
 1990 – 37,134
 2000 – 39,423
 2002 – 39,905
 2004 – 41,063
 2006 – 41,972
 2008 – 42,367
 2010 – 40,988
 2012 – 41,726
 2014 – 42,002
 2020 – 43,503

Mayors

 1876–1901: Christoph Kosack (independent)
 1901–1923: Franz Heinsohn
 1923–1933: Wilhelm Burmeister (SPD)
 1933–1937: Heinrich Backhaus (NSDAP)
 1937–1945: Karl Coors (NSDAP)
 1945: Dietmar Petersen (independent)
 1945–1950: Richard Köhn (SPD)
 1950–1963: Henry Glissmann (SPD)
 1963–1990: Hans-Hermann Kath (independent)
 1990–1996: Jan Nevermann (SPD)
 1996–2008: Horst-Werner Nitt (independent)
 2008–2012: Kristin Alheit (SPD)
 2012: Klaus Seyfert (CDU, temporary)
 Since 2013: Urte Steinberg (independent)

Transport

Many regional trains stop at Pinneberg railway station, which serves as the terminus of line S3 of the Hamburg S-Bahn rapid transit network. A second S-Bahn station – Thesdorf – is also located within Pinneberg.

Twin towns – sister cities

Pinneberg is twinned with:
 Rockville, United States

Notable people
Ludwig Meyn (1820–1878), agricultural scientist, soil scientist, geologist, journalist and mineralogist
Sophie Wörishöffer (1838–1890), author
Carl Schlüter (1848–1884), sculptor
Bernhard Siebken (1910–1949), SS officer and war criminal
Johannes Seifert (1915–1943), Luftwaffe military aviator and World War II fighter ace
Mario Szenessy (1930–1976), Hungarian-German author, translator, and literary critic, died here
Michael Westphal (1965–1991), tennis player
Michael Stich (born 1968), tennis player 
Dirk Penkwitz (born 1969), TV presenter

Marcel Barthel (born 1990), professional wrestler

References

External links

 
Webcam in Pinneberg

Towns in Schleswig-Holstein
Pinneberg (district)